The National Greyhound Association (NGA) is the primary registry body for racing purebred dog Greyhound pedigrees in the United States. The National Greyhound Association also houses and jointly runs the American Greyhound Council. Its main purposes is to provide humane advocacy, welfare policy and support to the adoption network.

The association serves to provide policy and maintain standards of care to preserve the greyhound breed and bloodlines.

It is headquartered in Abilene, Kansas.

Non-racing greyhounds are registered in the U.S. by the American Kennel Club.

History

The National Greyhound Association, a voluntary non-profit association operated in accordance with the laws of Kansas, is officially recognized by the entire greyhound racing industry—namely, all greyhound racetracks and individual racing jurisdictions, as well as foreign greyhound registries and governing bodies—as the sole registry for racing greyhounds on the North American continent.

Organized in 1906, it has functioned in this capacity ever since the inception of greyhound track racing in this country of more than 1,500 greyhound owners and breeders whose greyhounds compete at tracks throughout the continent. Records on all breeding, litters whelped, individual registrations, transfers, leases, etc., are maintained at the association’s headquarters in Abilene, Kansas.

The National Greyhound Association’s rigid identification system plays a key role in maintaining the integrity of the greyhound racing sport. It is also a primary goal of the association to promote the improvement and development of the greyhound breed itself, through maintenance of pedigree and Stud-book records dating back to the latter part of the 19th century. The organization is an associate member of the World Greyhound Racing Federation and a charter and founding member of the World Alliance of Greyhound Registries and the American Greyhound Council, an organization established in 1987 with the American Greyhound Track Operators Association (AGTOA) to fund and oversee greyhound health, welfare and adoption programs.

Greyhound adoption

More than 95 percent of all registered racing greyhounds are adopted or returned to the farm as pets or breeders, thanks to exceptional cooperation and communication between greyhound racing and hundreds of dedicated adoption organizations coast to coast. The goal is to achieve 100 percent placement of all eligible greyhounds in the near future. Toward that end, the National Greyhound Association, greyhound tracks and industry organizations spend more than $1 million annually on track-based and independent adoption efforts. They include adoption grants, a national adoption hotline (1-800-366-1472), adoption events and conferences, training and support for adoption volunteers, and transport for greyhounds entering adoption programs.

Greyhound welfare

The National Greyhound Association has imposed strict regulations on greyhound owners and kennel operators. People who own a racing or breeding greyhound must register with the association. They must agree to accept full responsibility for their greyhound's welfare at all times, or face severe consequences, including possible expulsion from the association. Such expulsion effectively means permanent banishment from participation in greyhound racing throughout the U.S.

To ensure proper greyhound care on greyhound farms and in racing kennels at the track, the association has established comprehensive animal welfare guidelines based on veterinary recommendations. The guidelines cover virtually every aspect of greyhound care, including:

Nutrition and diet
Kennel facilities
Housing
Exercise
Health management
Sanitation and disease control
Operational supervision

Each year, the nation's 250 greyhound breeding farms and kennels are subject to unannounced inspections by the National Greyhound Association through the American Greyhound Council to verify compliance with the industry's animal welfare guidelines. One full-time inspector travels the country continually. He is assisted by 56 part-time inspectors who are frequently called upon to make unannounced visits to farms in their area.

The inspectors file written reports summarizing their findings. Minor violations are noted and corrected. Those who fail to correct the problems may be temporarily suspended from racing. More serious violations are addressed in hearings before the National Greyhound Association's governing body. Those guilty of such violations can be banned from the sport for life.

More than 99% of all greyhound owners comply with the guidelines. Fewer than half of one percent of the 2,000 greyhound owners in the country are found guilty of serious violations each year.

Board of directors
The Association is governed by a board consisting of nine members. The nine directors are elected by nine geographical districts. The President of the Association is Julia Ward. The Vice President is Fred Fulichino.
Other members of the Board of Directors are: James Blanchard, Leslie Csokasy, Steven Gilster, H. Hal Gill, Steve Sarras,  Byron Jay Childs, Gloria Dorsey.

References

External links
ngagreyhounds.com

Greyhound racing
Animal welfare in greyhound racing
Organizations based in Kansas
Kennel clubs